Ostrožno is a Slovene place name that may refer to:

Ostrožno (local community), a local community of the City Municipality of Celje
Ostrožno pri Ločah, a village in the Municipality of Slovenske Konjice, northeastern Slovenia
Ostrožno pri Ponikvi, a village in the Municipality of Šentjur, eastern Slovenia